Emlak Konut Mimar Sinan Anatolian High School (or EKMAL in short), is an Anatolian High School in Büyükçekmece, Istanbul, Turkey.

See also
 List of schools in Istanbul

External links 
 

High schools in Istanbul
2003 establishments in Turkey
Educational institutions established in 2003
Anatolian High Schools